Not to confuse with Brian MacLellan.

Brian McClellan (born January 25, 1986) is an American author of epic fantasy. He is best known for writing the trilogies The Powder Mage and Gods of Blood and Powder.

Biography
McClellan began writing when he was fifteen, starting at Wheel of Time role playing websites. He began working on short stories and novellas in his late teens, when he was encouraged toward writing by his parents.

McClellan went on to major in English with an emphasis on creative writing at Brigham Young University, where he met American author Brandon Sanderson, joining his writing classes. McClellan, wanting his writing to be more than just art, was determined to become a full-time writer. In 2006 he attended Orson Scott Card's Literary Bootcamp. In 2008 he received honorable mention in the Writers of the Future Contest.

McClellan published his first book, Promise of Blood, in 2013. The second book, The Crimson Campaign, was released in May 2014. In February 2015, his next novel, The Autumn Republic concluded the planned Powder Mage trilogy. He then published a sequel trilogy that had tentatively been entitled Goddess of the Empire before being replaced by the more thematically over-arching Gods of Blood and Powder. In 2019 Tor Books announced that they would be working with him to publish his new series, The Glass Immortals.

In 2014, his debut novel, Promise of Blood, won the Morningstar Award for Best Fantasy Newcomer.

Bibliography

The Powder Mage trilogy

 Promise of Blood (2013)
 The Crimson Campaign (2014)
 The Autumn Republic (2015)

Gods of Blood and Powder trilogy
 Sins of Empire (2017)
 Wrath of Empire (2018)
 Blood of Empire (2019)

Valkyrie Collections series
 Uncanny Collateral (2019)
 Blood Tally (2020)

The Glass Immortals series
 In the Shadow of Lightning (2022)

Novellas and Short Stories

Eleven novellas and short stories set in the world of The Powder Mage trilogy were released:

 Hope's End (2013)
 The Girl of Hrusch Avenue (2013)
 Forsworn (2014)
 The Face in the Window (2014)
 Servant of the Crown (2014)
 Murder at the Kinnen Hotel (2014)
 Return to Honor (2015)
 Green-Eyed Vipers (2015)
 Ghosts of the Tristan Basin (2016)
 The Mad Lancers (2017)
 Siege of Tilpur (2017)

Other
 War Cry'' (2018)

References

External links
 Official website of Brian McClellan

1986 births
Living people
American fantasy writers
American male novelists
21st-century American novelists
21st-century American male writers